Ben Mathews (born 29 November 1978) is a former Australian rules footballer who played for the Sydney Swans in the Australian Football League (AFL). Mathews originally played with Hopefield Buraja FC in the Coreen & District Football League, then was recruited from the Corowa Rutherglen of New South Wales, via the Murray Bushrangers.

He was part of the 2005 AFL premiership-winning side that defeated the West Coast Eagles. He announced his retirement on 2 September 2008.

He has served as the midfield coach of the Melbourne Football Club since September 2013 to end of 2020. He is now the assistant coach at Sydney Swans Football Club

Statistics

|- style="background-color: #EAEAEA"
! scope="row" style="text-align:center" | 1997
|style="text-align:center;"|
| 36 || 4 || 1 || 0 || 18 || 13 || 31 || 3 || 5 || 0.3 || 0.0 || 4.5 || 3.3 || 7.8 || 0.8 || 1.3
|-
! scope="row" style="text-align:center" | 1998
|style="text-align:center;"|
| 36 || 0 || — || — || — || — || — || — || — || — || — || — || — || — || — || —
|- style="background:#eaeaea;"
! scope="row" style="text-align:center" | 1999
|style="text-align:center;"|
| 36 || 17 || 4 || 0 || 122 || 82 || 204 || 47 || 16 || 0.2 || 0.0 || 7.2 || 4.8 || 12.0 || 2.8 || 0.9
|-
! scope="row" style="text-align:center" | 2000
|style="text-align:center;"|
| 36 || 22 || 2 || 4 || 270 || 164 || 434 || 102 || 30 || 0.1 || 0.2 || 12.3 || 7.5 || 19.7 || 4.6 || 1.4
|- style="background:#eaeaea;"
! scope="row" style="text-align:center" | 2001
|style="text-align:center;"|
| 4 || 23 || 4 || 2 || 264 || 146 || 410 || 113 || 46 || 0.2 || 0.1 || 11.5 || 6.3 || 17.8 || 4.9 || 2.0
|-
! scope="row" style="text-align:center" | 2002
|style="text-align:center;"|
| 4 || 21 || 4 || 1 || 211 || 150 || 361 || 66 || 65 || 0.2 || 0.0 || 10.0 || 7.1 || 17.2 || 3.1 || 3.1
|- style="background:#eaeaea;"
! scope="row" style="text-align:center" | 2003
|style="text-align:center;"|
| 4 || 23 || 4 || 0 || 237 || 152 || 389 || 94 || 59 || 0.2 || 0.0 || 10.3 || 6.6 || 16.9 || 4.1 || 2.6
|-
! scope="row" style="text-align:center" | 2004
|style="text-align:center;"|
| 4 || 24 || 6 || 8 || 239 || 204 || 443 || 109 || 94 || 0.3 || 0.3 || 10.0 || 8.5 || 18.5 || 4.5 || 3.9
|- style="background:#eaeaea;"
! scope="row" style="text-align:center" | 2005
|style="text-align:center;"|
| 4 || 25 || 6 || 4 || 200 || 161 || 361 || 77 || 75 || 0.2 || 0.2 || 8.0 || 6.4 || 14.4 || 3.1 || 3.0
|-
! scope="row" style="text-align:center" | 2006
|style="text-align:center;"|
| 4 || 14 || 5 || 2 || 83 || 77 || 160 || 44 || 37 || 0.4 || 0.1 || 5.9 || 5.5 || 11.4 || 3.1 || 2.6
|- style="background:#eaeaea;"
! scope="row" style="text-align:center" | 2007
|style="text-align:center;"|
| 4 || 23 || 8 || 2 || 168 || 137 || 305 || 89 || 67 || 0.3 || 0.1 || 7.3 || 6.0 || 13.3 || 3.9 || 2.9
|-
! scope="row" style="text-align:center" | 2008
|style="text-align:center;"|
| 4 || 2 || 1 || 1 || 12 || 11 || 23 || 9 || 4 || 0.5 || 0.5 || 6.0 || 5.5 || 11.5 || 4.5 || 2.0
|- class="sortbottom"
! colspan=3| Career
! 198
! 45
! 24
! 1824
! 1297
! 3121
! 753
! 498
! 0.2
! 0.1
! 9.2
! 6.6
! 15.8
! 3.8
! 2.5
|}

References

External links

 
 1993 -Coreen & DFL / NSW Under 15 State Team photo

1978 births
Living people
Australian rules footballers from New South Wales
Sydney Swans players
Sydney Swans Premiership players
Murray Bushrangers players
Corowa-Rutherglen Football Club players
One-time VFL/AFL Premiership players